The women's 1000 metres in speed skating at the 1964 Winter Olympics took place on 1 February, at the Eisschnellaufbahn.

Records
Prior to this competition, the existing world and Olympic records were as follows:

The following new Olympic record was set.

Results

References

Women's speed skating at the 1964 Winter Olympics
Olymp
Skat